Kibbee is an unincorporated community in Montgomery County, in the U.S. state of Georgia. The elevation of the town is 312 feet.

History
A post office called Kibbee was established in 1886, and remained in operation until 1976. The community most likely was named after Charles C. Kibbee, a local judge.

References

Unincorporated communities in Montgomery County, Georgia